Mollagüllər (also, Mollagyuler and Mollagyullar) is a village and municipality in the Barda Rayon of Azerbaijan.  It has a population of 1,252.

References

Populated places in Barda District